The Homs Sanjak was a prefecture (sanjak) of the Ottoman Empire, located in modern-day Syria. The city of Homs was the Sanjak's capital. It had a population of 200,410 in 1914. The Sanjak of Homs shared same region with Sanjak of Hama and Sanjak of Salamiyah.

References

Homs
States and territories established in 1549
Sanjaks of Ottoman Syria
1549 establishments in the Ottoman Empire
1918 disestablishments in the Ottoman Empire